David Clay Nohe (born May 10, 1952) is an American politician and a former Republican member of the West Virginia Senate representing District 3 between 2010 and 2015. Nohe was the mayor of Vienna, West Virginia from 1997 through 2012.

Education
Nohe attended West Virginia University at Parkersburg.

Elections
2010 Nohe challenged District 3 incumbent Senator Frank Deem and won the May 11, 2010 Republican Primary with 4,497 votes (52.4%), and won the November 2, 2010 General election with 21,295 votes (67.7%) against Democratic nominee Timothy Reed.

References

External links
Official page at the West Virginia Legislature

David Nohe at Ballotpedia
David C. Nohe at the National Institute on Money in State Politics

Place of birth missing (living people)
1952 births
Living people
Mayors of places in West Virginia
People from Parkersburg, West Virginia
Republican Party West Virginia state senators
West Virginia University at Parkersburg alumni
People from Vienna, West Virginia